Kal is a small village in the mountains north of the Bača Valley in the Municipality of Tolmin in the Littoral region of Slovenia. It no longer has any permanent residents.

References

External links 
Kal on Geopedia

Populated places in the Municipality of Tolmin